is a passenger railway station located in the city of Tamano, Okayama Prefecture, Japan, operated by the West Japan Railway Company (JR West).

Lines

Station layout
The station consists of two opposed side platforms on an embankment. The platforms are connected by a footbridge. There is no station building and the station is unattended. The track layout is a Y-branch (double opening), and there is no safety siding.

Platforms

Adjacent stations

History
Bizen-Tai Station was opened on 1 January 1939. The station was closed from 1 November 1940 to 15 November 1950. With the privatization of Japanese National Railways (JNR) on 1 April 1987, the station came under the control of JR West.

Passenger statistics
In fiscal 2019, the station was used by an average of 318 passengers daily

Surrounding area
Road Station Miyama Park
Tamano City Tai Elementary School

See also
List of railway stations in Japan

References

External links

 JR West Station Official Site

Railway stations in Okayama Prefecture
Uno Line
Railway stations in Japan opened in 1939
Tamano, Okayama